They Live in the Grey is a 2022 American supernatural horror film, written and directed by Abel Vang and Burlee Vang. The film stars Michelle Krusiec, Ken Kirby, Madelyn Grace, J.R. Cacia, and Ellen Wroe. The movie was released via streaming service Shudder on February 17, 2022.

Plot
The story of overcoming the grief of loss and feelings of guilt unfolds against the backdrop of a classic horror movie with ghosts and the dead. While investigating a possible domestic abuse, child protective services employee Claire Yang (Michelle Krusiec) discovers that the family of a case she is assigned to is being tormented by a supernatural entity.

Reception
Matt Donato of Paste wrote, "They Live in the Grey is a modest indie with thematic layers and evergreen mortal dread that could use two or three more editing bay passes. The longer everything goes, the harder actors strain to grasp the heartbreaking poignancy of irreplaceable loss. At times, They Live in the Grey can feel bisected between Claire’s paranormal home life and Sophie’s possible abuse, made worse by the Vangs’ choice to ditch linear storytelling for sometimes unnoticeable chronological leaps. It’s a courageous approach to relatable horrors that foolishly fails to keep things simple—one that desperately requires more focus to let Claire’s introspective gravedance truly shine." Leslie Felperin of The Guardian stated, "They Live in the Grey is another classy effort on the Shudder streaming platform, properly scary and thoughtfully constructed, with unusual editing and framing sleights of hand..."

Cast
Michelle Krusiec as Claire Yang
Ken Kirby as Peter Yang
Madelyn Grace as Sophie Lang
J.R. Cacia as Giles Lang
Ellen Wroe as Audrey Lang
Mercedes Manning as The Woman
Willie S. Hosea as Lloyd
Audrey Moore as Jane
Jaden Tran as Lucas Yang

References

External links
 
 

2022 films
2022 horror films
American supernatural horror films
2020s English-language films
Asian-American horror films
American multilingual films
2020s American films